Lena Annette Mårdberg (born December 30, 1963) is a Swedish female curler.

She is a 1990 Swedish women's champion.

Teams

Personal life
Her husband is Swedish curler Mikael Ljungberg, who played in the 1989 and 1994 World men's championships.

References

External links
 

Living people
1963 births
Swedish female curlers
Swedish curling champions